Ferrante II Gonzaga (1563 – 5 August 1630) was Count of Guastalla and, from 1621, Duke of Guastalla.

He was the son of Cesare I Gonzaga, Count of Guastalla and Duke of Amalfi, and Donna Camilla Borromeo. He succeeded his father in 1575. On 2 July 1621, the County of Guastalla was elevated to a Duchy and Ferrante was subsequently deemed a Duke.

1624 Ferdinand II appointed Ferrante as General Commissar in Italy to reinforce imperial authority.

Ferrante played a part in the War of the Mantuan Succession when, as a distant Gonzaga cousin, he claimed the Duchy of Mantua after the extinction of the senior male branch of the House of Gonzaga in December 1627. He was nominally supported by Habsburg Emperor Ferdinand II, who really sought to re-attach the Duchy of Mantua to the Holy Roman Empire. His attempt failed as the French candidate Charles of Nevers became the new Duke.

Issue
Ferrante II married Vittoria Doria (1569–1618), daughter of Giovanni Andrea Doria, and had 4 children :
 Cesare II Gonzaga (1592–1632), next Duke of Guastalla, married Donna Isabella Orsini
 Vincenzo Gonzaga (1602–1697), Viceroy of Sicily (1677–1678)
 Andrea Gonzaga, Count of San Paolo (died 1686), father of Vincenzo Gonzaga, Duke of Guastalla (1692–1714)
 Zenobia de Gonzaga y Doria (1588–1618), married in 1607 don Giovanni Tagliavia d'Aragona, Duke of Terranova.

References 

 

1563 births
1630 deaths
Ferrante 2
Ferrante 2
Ferrante 2
16th-century Italian nobility
17th-century Italian nobility
Dukes of Amalfi (Spanish title)